Robert Blohm (born May 27, 1948 in Trenton, New Jersey) is an American and Canadian investment banker, economist and statistician, currently a professor of economics at China's Central University of Finance and Economics. He helped expand the Japanese capital market in the 1980s to Canadian governments, corporations, utilities and banks. In the early 1990s he argued widely in the US and Canadian press against the economic feasibility of Quebec's separation from Canada, particularly in a series of opinion articles in The Wall Street Journal. He coined the term "the internet economy" in a Wall Street Journal opinion article by that title in 1996. In the later 1990s he published articles in the general and trade press against restructuring the wholesale electric industry into a centralized spot market. Blohm has since helped the North American Electric Reliability Council develop risk-based standards for reliably operating and planning the electric system in a competitive market.

References 

Publications by or featuring Robert Blohm
Who's Who in the World
Who's Who in America
Who's Who in Finance and Business

1948 births
Living people
Businesspeople from Trenton, New Jersey
Economists from New Jersey
21st-century American economists